Abdoulie Sanyang (born 8 May 1999) is a Gambian footballer who plays for Grenoble in the French Ligue 2.

Club career
Sanyang joined Lommel in the summer 2019 transfer window, arriving on a loan basis from Superstars Academy in Gambia together with his fellow countrymen Alieu Jallow and Salif Kujabi. Sanyang was awarded several starts over the coming months and even managed to score the equalizing goal in the 2019–20 Belgian Cup match against Standard Liège, his team eventually going down 2–1 due to a last minute winner by the home team.

On 1 February 2022, Sanyang signed a 2.5-year contract with French club Grenoble.

References

External links

1999 births
Living people
Association football midfielders
Gambian footballers
The Gambia international footballers
Lommel S.K. players
K Beerschot VA players
Grenoble Foot 38 players
Belgian Pro League players
Challenger Pro League players
Ligue 2 players
Gambian expatriate footballers
Gambian expatriate sportspeople in Belgium
Expatriate footballers in Belgium
Gambian expatriate sportspeople in France
Expatriate footballers in France